Leonardus is an extinct mammal genus from the Late Cretaceous (Late Santonian to Maastrichtian) of South America. It is a meridiolestidan dryolestoid, closely related to the also Late Cretaceous Cronopio and the Miocene Necrolestes.

Description 
Leonardus is a fairly small mammal, similar in size to Necrolestes. It is known from two specimens, the holotype MACN-RN 172, composed of a left maxilla, four associated molariform teeth and two pairs of alveoli, and MACN-RN 1907, a right mandible with two molariforms. Said molariforms are vaguely peg-like, with a dome-like stylocone.

Discovery 
Leonardus is currently only known from the Los Alamitos Formation, Argentina. The holotype was found in 1990, while the second specimen was described more recently in 2010.

Classification 
Leonardus was originally referred to Dryolestidae, but the lack of a parastylar hook on the molariforms, as well as a few features of the stylocone, suggest that it was grouped with other South American and African dryolestoids at the exclusion of Laurasian species, in a clade known as Meridiolestida. Within Meridiolestida, it consistently groups with Necrolestes and Cronopio.

Paleobiology 
Leonardus' teeth are noted as being unique among dryolestids and the animal would have had an orthal and transverse jaw-stroke with tooth-to-tooth shearing, though no further comments have been made on its diet.

References 

Dryolestida
Cretaceous mammals of South America
Late Cretaceous tetrapods of South America
Santonian life
Campanian life
Maastrichtian life
Late Cretaceous genus first appearances
Late Cretaceous genus extinctions
Cretaceous Argentina
Fossils of Argentina
Los Alamitos Formation
Fossil taxa described in 1990
Prehistoric mammal genera